Transformers Universe is the title of several comic book series based on the Transformers series by Hasbro. The first comic book was printed in 1986 by Marvel Comics as a character guide, while later series printed by 3H Enterprises contained fiction for the Transformers: Universe toy line.

Marvel Comics

Transformers Universe refers to the four-issue limited series published by Marvel Comics in 1986 to showcase profiles of the most popular characters in the Transformers comic and cartoon series as well as The Transformers: The Movie. The series was requested by fans who were already familiar with Marvel's 12+ issues of Marvel Universe, which profiled the characters in alphabetical order. The four-issue run covered most Transformers used from 1984 to 1986 (only Bandai-made figures and those omitted from the American animated series were not shown). A series of Transformers Universe profiles were printed in the closing pages of most Transformers comics from issue #47 to #79. The later profiles covered popular characters in 1987 and 1988. The concept was revived in 2002 when Dreamwave Productions published Transformers: More Than Meets the Eye (and its sister title Transformers: Armada), this time carrying profiles for all "Generation 1" and "Armada" characters, both popular and obscure.

Fun publications

The BotCon comics had a plot line set during and after Beast Machines In a post-Beast Machines era, Cybertron is enjoying a time of peace. However, it is cut short when the evil Unicron returns to wreak his revenge and consume the universe. Using his tremendous powers, he reaches into other time periods and dimensions to assemble an army of familiar faces to challenge the forces of good. In response, Primus resurrects and reformats Optimus Primal, and the two work together to gather an army of their own. Each side takes the name of an ancient Transformer faction: Primus' warriors are the Autobots and Unicron's warriors are the Decepticons. As the battle progresses, the Transformers radiate energon, unaware that Unicron is taking this energy to use for himself.

In the comic series, Unicron consumes the sparks of fallen Transformers, not just the energon given off when they die fighting.

Most Universe toys lacked technical specifications on their boxes, but many of the toys displayed  technical specifications that appeared on the Transformers' official website or in the short lived Transformers: Universe and Wreckers comic books.

3H Enterprises

The Transformers Universe comic series was released through the Official Transformers Collector's Club. The Collector's Club came to an end when the license and convention was given to the Master Collector.

Transformers Universe — Wreckers #1 contains  "Departure" and "Primeval Dawn Part 1". The story starts  with a flashback to late Generation One, where Daniel Witwicky and Wheelie were killed. This places Daniel's friend Arcee in a sad state. Hot Rod and Springer talk about becoming Maximals. The main story is set in the later episodes of Beast Machines. In "Departure", the Wreckers, Mutants, and Dinobots arrive on Cybertron and are sent on missions by the Oracle. Arcee, Dillo, Mol, Rav, Skywarp, Cyclonus, Rotorbolt, and Devcon join the Wreckers. The Vok return Airazor and Tigatron to Earth as Transmetals, and use the Matrix from Optimus Prime, the Transmetal 2 Driver, and the control suit from the Beast Wars, which was used by Quickstrike to control Optimal Optimus to create Primal Prime. Tarantulas (Fox Kids repaint colors) and Ravage (Transmetal 2 Tripredacus Agent version) are still alive and are making a new army of Predacons.

Transformers Universe - Wreckers #2 contains  "Betrayal" and "Primeval Dawn Part 2". The Dinobots are attacked by the Dweller. Mutants are killed by the Quintessons. The Wreckers meet Glyph and Tap-Out. Cyclonus betrays the Wreckers for his true master, Cryotek. The Maximals are joined by Ramulus. The Predacons (Ravage, Razorclaw, Spittor, and Iguanus) attack, while the Tarantulas rip the Matrix out of Primal Prime. In a flashback scene, Rodimus Prime consults Quickmix, Skids, Perceptor, and Rad about his plans to send ships to gather information about threats from space after the defeat of the Unicron.

Transformers Universe - Wreckers #3 contains a story called "Disclosure" and "Primeval Dawn Part 3". The Wreckers rescue a banished Quintesson, who tells the story of the origin of Cybertron. Dinobots Terranotron, T-Wrecks, Triceradon, and Dinotron join Devcon, who is hunting Cryotek. Primal Prime is reanimated by the Vok.

Transformers Universe - Wreckers #4 is an unreleased issue. The main story would have merged with the other Universe comic. The artwork was released on the internet, and contained appearances of the Dinobots, Devcon, Rook, Snarl, Skydive, Longhorn, Che, and the Monsterbots. The story involved the invasion of Cybertron by the Quintessons. This episode would have included "Primeval Dawn Part 4", the last part of that story. Presumably, the story would have contained the death of Airazor, the defeat of Tarantulas, and the Maximals being joined by Fractyl, Packrat, Spittor, and Sonar and returning to Cybertron. The first four pages of this issue were eventually finished and published in issue 16 of the Transformers Collector Club magazine.

Transformers Universe #1 contains a story called "Abduction". On the reformatted technorganic Cybertron Beast Machines Cheetor, Rattrap, Silverbolt, and Blackarachnia are interviewed by the Autobot reporter Universe Rook. They welcome the Autobots Roulette, Shadow Striker as well as Generation 1 Sideswipe, Sunstreaker, and Trailbreaker back to Cybertron. Beast Machines Buzzsaw, Beast Wars Drill Bit, Quickstrike, and Rockbuster are also present. The returning Autobots, with Blackarachnia and Silverbolt, are abducted via teleportation beams and taken to Unicron. Tap-Out, Armada Megatron, Brawn, War Within Grimlock, and Beast Machines Snarl are also abducted from various timelines. Silverbolt, Blackarachnia, Sideswipe, and Sunstreaker are forcibly reformatted by Unicron into their Universe forms. Taken captive by Universe Razorclaw, Reptilion, Obsidian, Tankor and Striker, the Autobots are forced to fight one another. They witness Armada Smokescreen kill Generation 1 Smokescreen, whose spark is absorbed by Unicron. Sensing the need for a champion, Primus and Alpha Trion bring Optimus Primal back to life.

Transformers Universe #2 contains the story "Escape". Optimus Primal is able to use his spark telepathy to free Striker from Unicron's influence. Sideswipe and Sunstreaker are forced to fight. Silverbolt and Trailbreaker discover that their holding cells are attuned to the spark energy signature of the occupant. In order to escape their prisons, Trailbreaker and Silverbolt swap sparks for a brief time, and are able to break out of their cells. Optimus Primal help free the slaves from various timelines which are held there and get them to Cybertron. Blackarachnia and Shadow Striker defect to the Decepticons and stay behind. Blackarachnia discovers Tarantulas is working for Unicron.

Transformers Universe #3 Optimus Primal pleads with Magnaboss and the Maximal High council (including Bantor, Air Hammer, Corahda, Torca, and Battle Unicorn) to take the threat of Unicron seriously, but they doubt his claims. Optimus Primal is detained, but Snarl frees him. Alpha Trion and Primus need Primal to choose his troops from any Cybertonians past or present, and he chooses Rhinox and Depth Charge, who are brought back to life. Although Rhinox is happy to have a second chance to redeem himself, Depth Charge is not pleased with being brought back from the dead. Depth Charge rescues Rattrap from an attack by Blackarachnia.

Plans were for the two titles to merge after the fourth issues into one story, but both titles were canceled after the third issue and never merged.

OFTCC Voice Actor Dramas

In the 2003 OFTCC Voice Actor Drama by Simon Furman War Within Grimlock, Armada Megatron, and Universe Optimus Primal are each transported to the Unicron world, where they team up and fight Striker and Reptilion. This story takes place between issues #1 and #2 of the Transformers: Universe comic series. There is a small continuity error in that this story ends with Grimlock, Megatron, and Primal standing over Reptilion, but issue #2 of the comic starts with them standing over Striker.

The Voice Actor Drama was written for OFTCC 2004 by Simon Furman, set after the events in the comics. Rhinox builds a device to deflect Unicron's attempts to pull victims from other dimensions with his tractor beam. The Autobots deflect two attempts and the victims end up on a frozen planetoid instead of with Unicron. Maximals Rattrap and Silverbolt and the Predacon Waspinator are sent to help the victims, but Reptilion, Sunstorm, Ruination, and the Mini-Con gestalt Perceptor are sent to get them for Unicron. As a side effect of the device Rhinox built, a vortex opens which sucks in an Autobot shuttle from the past piloted by Bumblebee, Tracks, and Cosmos. Sunstorm attacks the Maximal ship, but they are saved by being transported to the Autobot shuttle. The Autobots and Maximals then go to the planet, where they save the victims from the Decepticons. On the planet are two groups of Autobots. One is from the Robots in Disguise story, with Landfill (Walmart recolor), Universe Side Burn and Universe Prowl. The other is from another parallel world with Spy Changer Optimus Prime, Ultra Magnus, Prowl and Ironhide. They successfully fight off the Decepticons. The Autobot shuttle is sent back to its own time.

Fun publications

The Transformers: Cybertron comic features Sentinel Maximus, a character who is the fused form of the Transformers characters Primal Prime and Apelinq, who were merged to be able to defeat Cryotek during an untold story. Universe characters Nemesis Prime, Ramjet and his Mini-Cons also appear in this story.

In the comic story found in issue 8 of the Transformers Collectors Club magazine Robots in Disguise, Optimus Prime told the story of the last battle he was in, set in the Transformers: Universe storyline. Alongside 10th Anniversary Optimus Primal they attacked the last of Unicron's forces when Unicron suddenly disappears, and they barely escape. Among the Autobot forces are Universe Fireflight, King Atlas, Universe Night Slash Cheetor, Universe Longhorn, Universe Prowl, Universe Repugnus, Rhinox, Universe Side Burn, Universe Silverbolt, Generation One Sideswipe, Generation One Sunstreaker, Tap-Out, Trailbreaker, Cybertron/Robots in Disguise Ultra Magnus, and Universe Whirl. Among the Decepticons are Universe Blackarachnia, Nemesis Strika, Universe Obsidian, Universe Razorclaw, Reptilion, and Universe Skywarp.

Non-Universe toys which appeared in Universe
Besides the official Transformers: Universe toys, the comic book series had appearances from a great number of characters from other toy lines. This list attempts to account for all the non-Universe characters/toys who made appearances in the two Universe comic series and the Botcon voice plays.

Transformers: Generation 1
 Alpha Trion
 Doublecross
 Grimlock - In his War Within form.
 Grotusque
 Hot Rod - Now known as Rodimus in "The Wreckers"
 Kup
 Perceptor
 Quickmix
 Rad
 Repugnus - Although there was a Universe version of Repugnus, the Repugnus who appeared in Wreckers #4 was in his Generation 1 form
 Rodimus Prime - Appeared in a flashback of Rodimus as Rodimus Prime
 Sideswipe - Appeared in Generation 1 form before being reformatted into Universe form, then was returned to Generation 1 form
 Skids
 Smokescreen
 Sunstreaker - Appeared in Generation 1 form before being reformatted into Universe form, then was returned to Generation 1 form

Appeared in a flashback to Generation 1 Era
 Arcee
 Hot Spot
 Sky Garry
 Springer
 Sureshot (Transformers)

2004 Botcon voice actor play
 Bumblebee
 Cosmos
 Tracks

Characters fleeing captivity from Unicron
 Big Daddy - Micromaster appeared among the characters fleeing captivity from Unicron
 Brawn
 Ransack
 Squeezeplay
 Trailbreaker
 Wheelie - Appeared in a flashback to Generation 1 Era and among the characters fleeing captivity from Unicron

Transformers: Armada
 Megatron
 Red Alert
 Smokescreen - A recolor of Armada Smokescreen was released in the toy line, but in the Universe comics Armada Smokescreen appeared in his original colors
 Star Saber - Appeared in the 2003 Botcon voice actor play being wielded by Megatron
 Unicron

Beast Wars
 Fractyl
 Packrat - Blue Transmetal Rattrap toy appeared as Transmetal Packrat
 Rhinox
 Rockbuster - Appeared among the crowd on Cybertron in Transformers: Universe #1
 Sonar
 Terrorsaur - Appeared among the characters fleeing the captivity of Unicron

Maximal High Council
 Airhammer
 Bantor
 Magnaboss
 Torca

Primeval Dawn Storyline
 Airazor (Transmetal)
 Iguanus (Transmetal 2)
 Ramulus
 Razorclaw
 Spittor (Transmetal 2)
 Tarantulas (Transmetal - Fox Kids Repaint)
 Tripredacus Agent (Transmetal 2)

Beast Machines
 Airraptor - Appeared as a member of the Dinobots
 Ape-Linq
 Battle Unicorn - Appeared as a member of the Maximal High Council
 Blackarachnia - Appeared in Beast Machines form before being reformatted into Universe form
 Buzzsaw - Appeared among the crowd on Cybertron
 Cheetor - Appeared in Beast Machines form throughout the Universe comic
 Chro - Name given to blue version of Deployer Rav
 Quickstrike - Appeared among the crowd on Cybertron
 Rattrap - Appeared in Beast Machines form throughout the Universe comic
 Silverbolt - Appeared in Beast Machines form before being reformatted into Universe form
 Thrust - Appeared among the captives of Unicron

Characters in "The Wreckers" Comics
 Blastcharge - Although a repaint of Blastcharge was released in the Universe line, the Blastcharge who appeared in the Wreckers comic #1 was in his original colors
 CatSCAN
 Dillo
 Magmatron
 Mol
 Nightscream
 Optimus Primal - Appeared in Wreckers comics and in flashback to his death
 Primal Prime
 Rav
 Scavenger
 Spy Streak
 T-Wrecks

Transformers: Robots in Disguise
 Cryotek
 Dreadwing - Appeared in a Collectors Club bio page as a Universe character
 Jhiaxus - Appeared in a Collectors Club bio page as the Generation 1 character
 Megabolt - Appeared in a Collectors Club bio page as a Universe character
 Landfill - Walmart Exclusive yellow recolor, appeared in the 2004 voice actor play
 Smokejumper - Appeared in a Collectors Club bio page as a Universe character

References

Crossover comics
Marvel Comics titles
Universe